Dulverton was a rural district in Somerset, England, from 1894 to 1974.

It was created in 1894 under the Local Government Act 1894.

In 1974 it was abolished under the Local Government Act 1972 and responsibilities transferred to West Somerset.

The parishes that were part of the district included: Brompton Regis, Brushford, Dulverton, Exford, Exmoor, Exton, Huish Champflower, Skilgate, Upton, Winsford and Withypool and Hawkridge.

See also
Local Government Act 1972

References

External links
Dulverton Rural District at Britain through Time

Districts of England created by the Local Government Act 1894
Districts of England abolished by the Local Government Act 1972
History of Somerset
Local government in Somerset
Rural districts of England